Silvicultrix is a genus of South American birds in the tyrant flycatcher family Tyrannidae.

The genus was erected by the American ornithologist Wesley E. Lanyon in 1986 with the yellow-bellied chat-tyrant (Silvicultrix diadema) as the type species.

Species
The genus contains five species:

These species were formerly included in the genus Ochthoeca.

References

 
Bird genera